A Little Piece of Heaven is a 1991 American made-for-television family drama film directed by Mimi Leder, written by Betty Goldberg, starring Kirk Cameron, Chelsea Noble, Lacey Chabert, Jenny Robertson, Ron McLarty, Jussie Smollett, and Cloris Leachman. It originally premiered December 2, 1991 on NBC.

Plot 
Will Loomis (Kirk Cameron) is living with his mentally disabled sister Violet (Jenny Robertson) after their parents have died. She wants a young child to play with for Christmas, so Will drugs and kidnaps a child from the local orphanage, and later, when his sister says she doesn't like the boy and demands her brother gets her a girl, Will kidnaps a girl from an abusive home.

The children are told they have died and are in heaven. Will and Violet try to make their farm "a little piece of heaven" for the kids, while the authorities wonder what has happened to the missing children.

After the police locate the children, Will is arrested.  During a hearing, both children defend Will's actions. A judge orders Will to open their farm to other disadvantaged children which the court will assign to their care.

Cast

Awards 
Emmy Awards
1992, Outstanding Individual Achievement in Music Composition for a Miniseries or a Special (Nominated)

Young Artist Awards
1993, Best Young Actress Under Ten in a Television Movie, Lacey Chabert (Nominated)

References

External links 
 

1991 television films
1991 films
1991 drama films
Films scored by Don Davis (composer)
Films about children
Films directed by Mimi Leder
NBC network original films
American drama television films
1990s English-language films
1990s American films
Films about disability